Leonie Anne Coleman (born 5 February 1979 in Tamworth, New South Wales) is a retired Australian cricketer. A wicket-keeper, Coleman played in one Test match and 24 One Day Internationals for the Australian national women's cricket team. Coleman is the 151st woman to play Test cricket for Australia.

After making her international debut against New Zealand in 2004, she suffered an injury which kept her out of the international side for several years. She earned a recall to the national side just before the 2007–08 Ashes series, when first choice wicket-keeper Jodie Fields (then Jodie Purves) broke her thumb in a club match. However, Coleman retired from international cricket following the 2009 Women's Cricket World Cup, after Fields was preferred as wicket-keeper throughout the tournament. Coleman is the 99th woman to play One Day International cricket for Australia.

Coleman played domestic cricket for the New South Wales Breakers from 1996 to 2009, then played for the ACT Meteors from 2009 to 2011.

References

External links

1979 births
ACT Meteors cricketers
Australia women One Day International cricketers
Australia women Test cricketers
Australia women Twenty20 International cricketers
Cricketers from New South Wales
Living people
New South Wales Breakers cricketers
People from Tamworth, New South Wales
Wicket-keepers